The 1994 Croatia Open Umag was a men's tennis tournament played on outdoor clay courts in Umag, Croatia that was part of the World Series of the 1994 ATP Tour. It was the fifth edition of the tournament and was held from 22 August through 29 August 1994. First-seeded Alberto Berasategui won the singles title.

Finals

Singles

 Alberto Berasategui defeated  Karol Kučera, 6–2, 6–4
 It was Berasategui's 3rd title of the year and the 4th of his career.

Doubles

 Diego Pérez /  Francisco Roig defeated  Karol Kučera /  Paul Wekesa, 6–2, 6–4
 It was Perez only title of the year and the 4th of his career. It was Roig's only title of the year and the 4th of his career.

References

External links
 ITF tournament edition details

Croatia Open Umag
Croatia Open
1994 in Croatian tennis